The Post-Tensioning Institute (PTI) is a nonprofit organization committed to advancing the quality, safety, efficiency, profitability, and use of post-tensioning systems. PTI's manuals and technical guides provide guidance on the design, construction, maintenance, and repair/rehabilitation of post-tensioned concrete structures. Additionally, PTI aims to ensure that specifiers and purchasers of post-tensioning materials receive products and services that meet a standard of quality through its plant and field personnel certification programs. Members of the Institute include major post-tensioning companies, as well as more than 500 professional members, engineers, architects, and contractors from around the globe.

History
Members of the Institute include major post-tensioning materials fabricators, Material manufacturers for prestressing, and companies supplying materials, services, and equipment used in post-tensioned construction. Additionally, members include professional engineers, architects and contractors.

Technical Committees
The Technical Advisory Board reviews and oversees all technical activities of the Institute, including education and certification.
 Barrier Cable
 Bonded Tendon
 Bridges
 Building Design
 Cable-Stayed Bridges
 Grouting
 Rock & Soil Anchors
 Repair, Rehabilitation, and Strengthening
 Slab-on-Ground
 Unbonded Tendon

References
 "Post-Tensioning Institute website", Post-Tensioning Institute.

Trade associations based in the United States